The Battle of Autas or Awtas was an early battle involving Muslim forces, fought in the year 630 in Awtas, after the Battle of Hunayn, but prior to the siege of Ta'if. Muhammad came with 12,000 fighters against a coalition of tribes. An ambush took place and a rain of arrows were fired on the Muslims. The Muslims, however, came out victorious.

Background
A league of mountain tribes hostile to Muhammad formed an alliance to attack him.

The league consisted of Thaqifs, Hawazins, Joshimites, Saadites and several other hardened mountain tribes. According to Islamic tradition the valley of the Banu Sa'd (who Irving called "Saadites") is where Muhammad was nurtured as a child and was also purified by an Angel.

The Thaqifs were idolaters who worshipped Allāt. They controlled the productive area of Ta'if, and were also the tribe which drove Muhammad out of Ta'if, pelting stones at him in the public square, when he was first preaching Islam.

Battle 
Muhammad went to Autas with 12,000 men. As the Muslim army passed through the valley of Hunain, a group of hostile tribes fired rain of arrows on the Muslims.

The attacked surprised the Muslims, and many fled away from the arrows. Only nine men remained with Muhammad. After a while the Muslim regrouped and gathered around Muhammad. They then marched to Autas, after a confrontation, the tribes were defeated and the Muslims captured a large amount of war booty.

Autas captives 

The Muslims took many captives on the day of Hunayn and Utas, and they hated the women of captivity if they had husbands, so they asked the Messenger of God about that, so he revealed {And chaste women are only those that your oaths possess, and they have husbands}. Abu Saeed: We caught captives on the day of Utas, and they had wives, so we thought we should fall on them. And the Prophet, may God’s prayers and peace be upon him, commanded in the captivity of Hunayn and Awtas that a pregnant woman from captivity should not have intercourse until she gave birth, and that a non-pregnant woman should not have intercourse until her menstruation period. They asked about isolation, and he said: “It is not from all water that a child is born, and if God wants to create something, nothing prevents him.”6

References

6.[3] مختصر سيرة الرسول. الشيخ عبد الله بن محمد بن عبد الوهاب نسخة محفوظة 04 يوليو 2017 على موقع واي باك مشين.

Campaigns led by Muhammad
Autas
630